Qəriblik (also, Gariblik and Karblyuk) is a village in the Davachi Rayon of Azerbaijan.  The village forms part of the municipality of Çuxurazəmi.

References

External links

Populated places in Shabran District